This list of humanitarian and service awards is an index to articles on notable awards given for humanitarianism and service in the sense of community service, public service or selfless service. The list is organized by region and country. Some of the awards are restricted to citizens or residents of one country or region, while others are not restricted.

International. (nations)

Africa

Americas

Canada

United States

Asia

Europe

Oceania

See also

 Lists of awards
 List of awards for contributions to society

References

 
Humanitarian and service awards